MR3V/6V project name, for "Matériel Roulant 3 Voitures / 6 Voitures" (Rolling Stock 3 Cars / 6 Cars) are future rolling stock, to equip the new lines 15, 16 and 17 of the Paris Metro.

Background 
In May 2018, the Société du Grand Paris announced that the manufacturer Alstom was approached to win the contracts for the trains on lines 15, 16 and 17 of the Grand Paris Express. The contract provides for the delivery of a maximum of 1,000 cars, which are divided into 133 six-car trains for line 15 and 50 three-car trains for lines 16 and 17, all based on the Metropolis.

On 20 September 2018, the contract was officially signed with Alstom for the manufacture of rolling stock for a total cost of 1.3 billion euros and, quickly, a sketch of the design of this rolling stock was unveiled. The first 3-car sets were seen at the beginning of November 2021 in dynamic tests in the Alstom rail test centre in Valenciennes.

Description 
The MR3V / MR6V are fully automated with open-gangway connections. The capacity of the trains is respectively, for the compositions of three and six cars, 500 and 1000 seats, 20% of which are seated. They will be powered by a  overhead catenary.

Exterior 

The exterior design of the trains is unveiled in early December 2018 with three variants. A consultation open to the public takes place during December 2018 to allow the choice of the chosen design. After 20 days of consultation and 13,000 voters, it was the second design with "encompassing lines for the nose of the train" that was chosen by 40% of respondents.

Interior 

The interior of the trains will have the new IDFM seats.

Formations

MR6V 
  will use driverless trains in a 6-car formation, MR6V (4M2T).

As of 1 March 2022, 2 six-car sets were built at Valenciennes factory.

MR3V 
  will use driverless trains . These will be 3-car trainsets, MR3V. (2M1T).

As of 5 May 2022, three completed trains are on standby at Alstom factory for tests.

Cars 1 and 3 have 2 pantograph both (one for emergency, on for service)
"M" motorised car
"T" Trailer car

References 

Paris Métro rolling stock
Alstom multiple units
1500 V DC multiple units of France